"Warm Ways" is a song performed by British/American music group Fleetwood Mac. The song was written and performed by group keyboardist/vocalist Christine McVie. In October 1975, "Warm Ways" was released as the lead single from the album entitled Fleetwood Mac in the United Kingdom. It was not released as a single in the United States, where "Over My Head" was issued as the first single instead.

The 'single version' of the song, released for radio airplay, is a slightly edited version that is different from the version appearing on the Fleetwood Mac album. The single did not chart in Britain, with only the fourth single from the album, "Say You Love Me" managing to chart upon its original release.

Personnel
Christine McVie – keyboards, lead vocals
Lindsey Buckingham – guitars, harmony vocals
Stevie Nicks – harmony vocals
John McVie – bass guitar
Mick Fleetwood – drums, gong

References

The Great Rock Discography. Martin C.Strong. Page 378. 

Fleetwood Mac songs
1975 singles
Songs written by Christine McVie
Song recordings produced by Keith Olsen
Reprise Records singles
1975 songs